Mahindra World City, Jaipur is a multi-product Special Economic Zone based on the concept of an "Integrated Business City". It comprises SEZs, Industrial Parks, Retail and Social Infrastructure.

History
In 2007, Mahindra World City, Jaipur was inaugurated by former Chief Minister of Rajasthan, Vasundhara Raje. It is a joint undertaking by Mahindra Lifespace Developers Ltd (a Mahindra Group Company) and Rajasthan State Industrial Development and Investment Corporation Ltd (RIICO), an agency of the Government of Rajasthan. It has been identified as one of the 16 projects globally by the Clinton Climate Initiative (CCI), a foundation upheld by Former US President Bill Clinton with a focus on sustainable development. 2017

Location
Mahindra World City is built near NH8 (Jaipur–Ajmer highway), and spread over an area of 3000 acres. Mahindra World City is located near Jaipur City, 18 km from the airport and 21 km from the railway station. Apart from Jaipur, Mahindra World City is presently operational at Chennai, Tamil Nadu.

Business Zone
The basic idea behind the development of Mahindra World City, Jaipur is to bring forth overall industrial development across different segments of the industry. The business zone is classified into a Domestic Tariff Area (DTA) for several industries and multi-product services with specific zones SEZs which include:
 IT/ITES
 Engineering and Related Industries
 Handicrafts
 Apparel
 Gems and Jewelry
 Warehousing and Logistics
Some of the prominent companies that are operational within Mahindra World City, Jaipur include Genpact, Appirio, Infosys, Wipro, ICICI Bank, Connexions, Deutsche Bank, GirnarSoft, Nagarro, Aro granite industries ltd., QH Talbros.

Recently the Isys softech is being inaugurated by Home Minister of Rajasthan Gulab Chand Kataria.

Social Infrastructure
The social infrastructure in Mahindra World City is comprehensive in terms of residential, learning, health institutes, and recreational zones. It also includes retail and hospitality centers as integral parts of the development.

Architecture
The layout of Mahindra World City, Jaipur has been conceptualized and planned by Jurong Consultants of Singapore. These consultants have been known for using efficient methods and approaches, developing Mahindra World City as a destination conducive for international and domestic corporates.

References

External links
 Mahindra World City Jaipur

Industrial parks in India
Special Economic Zones of India
Economy of Jaipur